Geoffrey Mujangi Bia (born 12 August 1989) is a Belgian international footballer who plays as a winger for Virton.

He established himself in Belgian football with Charleroi before experiencing the English Premier League with a loan spell at Wolverhampton Wanderers. In 2011, he returned to Belgium to join Standard Liège.

Club career
Mujangi Bia emigrated with his family from DR Congo to Zellik, Belgium as a young child. He began his football career on the books of the Brussels-based club Union Saint-Gilloise, before being spotted by Anderlecht. Although one of their academy's most promising players, he was released by the club.

After some months without a club, he joined Charleroi where he made his professional debut on 17 December 2006 in 0–1 defeat at Zulte Waregem, the first of three appearances that season. He scored his first senior goals the following season (3), before 2008–09 saw his most appearances yet as he played 28 league games.

The midfielder joined English Premier League club Wolverhampton Wanderers on loan on 21 January 2010 for the remainder of the 2009–10 season. He made his debut in the FA Cup against Crystal Palace on 23 January 2010. His Premier League debut followed as a substitute in a 2–2 draw at Hull City, one of three league appearances that season. At the season's end it was announced he would also spend the 2010–11 season with Wolves.

Mujangi Bia failed to break into Wolves' first team plans during the next season, making just one league appearance, as a late substitute at Manchester City. He scored his only goal for Wolves in a 5–0 FA Cup victory over Championship team Doncaster Rovers. In April 2011 it was announced that he would transfer to Standard Liège on a three-year deal once the transfer window re-opened in the summer.

The winger featured for Standard throughout the 2011–12 season as the club ended in fifth place. However, in August 2012, he was told he was no longer involved in the club's plans, and on 25 August signed for English Championship club Watford on a season-long loan deal, having already agreed to a long-term permanent contract; this will commence in summer 2013 if this option is exercised by Watford.

He made his Watford debut on 28 August 2012 in their League Cup exit to eventual finalists Bradford. After making two league appearances for Watford in the early part of the season, Bia made his first league appearance since the back end of 2012 as a substitute in a 0–1 defeat to Barnsley on 16 March 2013.

During the 2014–15 season Bia scored 14 and created a further 7 goals for Standard Liège.  However, after a row with coach Slavoljub Muslin Bia found himself in the B team. During the summer of 2015 a proposed move to Bursaspor fell through after they announced the signing of Hungarian Dzsudzsák. Finally Bia signed a three-year deal with Swiss side Sion.

On 10 May 2018, Bia helped Akhisar Belediyespor win their first professional trophy, the 2017–18 Turkish Cup.

On 5 February 2018 Bia was fired by his club KSC Lokeren on "grounds of urgency".

After not playing in 2021, on 28 January 2022 Mujangi Bia joined Virton.

Honours
Akhisarspor
 Turkish Cup (1): 2017–18

Career statistics

International career
Mujangi Bia turned down his birthplace DR Congo to instead represent the Belgium national football team. He made his international debut on 29 May 2009 in a Kirin Cup draw against Chile. He has previously also played for Belgium at under-21 level.

References

External links
 
 
 Guardian Football
 
 

1989 births
Living people
Association football midfielders
Footballers from Kinshasa
Belgian footballers
Belgium international footballers
Belgium youth international footballers
Democratic Republic of the Congo footballers
Belgian people of Democratic Republic of the Congo descent
R. Charleroi S.C. players
Wolverhampton Wanderers F.C. players
Watford F.C. players
Standard Liège players
FC Sion players
Kayserispor footballers
Akhisarspor footballers
K.S.C. Lokeren Oost-Vlaanderen players
Maccabi Petah Tikva F.C. players
R.E. Virton players
Belgian Pro League players
Premier League players
English Football League players
Swiss Super League players
Süper Lig players
Liga Leumit players
Challenger Pro League players
Democratic Republic of the Congo emigrants to Belgium
Belgian expatriate footballers
Expatriate footballers in England
Expatriate footballers in Switzerland
Expatriate footballers in Turkey
Expatriate footballers in Israel
Belgian expatriate sportspeople in England
Belgian expatriate sportspeople in Switzerland
Belgian expatriate sportspeople in Turkey
Belgian expatriate sportspeople in Israel